Min Bahadur Bham is a Nepalese film director. He has won various awards including the National Film Award for Best Writer, the Norwegian Sorfond Award at the Cannes Film Festival, and the Fedeora Award at the Venice Film Festival.

In 2015, The Black Hen was selected as the Nepalese entry for the Best Foreign Language Film at the 89th Academy Awards but it was not nominated.

Bham was born in Mugu District, Karnali Province, Nepal.

Filmography

References

External links

Nepalese film directors
Year of birth missing (living people)
Living people
People from Mugu District
21st-century Nepalese screenwriters
21st-century Nepalese film directors